The Radical RXC is a line of track-only race cars and street-legal road cars built by British manufacturer Radical Sportscars. The first street-legal RXC was unveiled in January 2013 at the Autosport International auto show, and it has since been offered in many different engine and racing configurations.

Models

RXC (2013–2016) 
The original RXC launched in 2013 for the 2014 model year in two street-legal forms: the RXC V6 and the optional upgraded RXC V8. The standard V6, a modified version of the 3.7 L Ford Duratec 37 Cyclone, produces  @ 6,750 rpm and  @ 4,250 rpm. The V8 came in two engine configurations, a 2.7 L and a 3.0 L, both in-house designs based on the inline-four engine used in the Suzuki Hayabusa. The 2.7 L produces  @ 9,500 rpm and  @ 7,200 rpm, while the 3.0 L produces  @ 9,100 rpm and  @ 7,500 rpm. The RXC was based on the design of the previous Radical SR9 Le Mans prototype, and features a body made out of mostly carbon fibre composites. Both engines are mated to 7-speed semi-automatic transmission manufactured by Quaife, mounted transversely and driving the rear wheels. Standard features inside the RXC include air conditioning, power steering, heated windscreen and mirrors, and a multi-function adjustable steering wheel.

RXC Turbo / RXC GT (2014–present) 
The RXC Turbo was unveiled at the 2014 Autosport International show, one year after the reveal of the original RXC. The RXC Turbo adds a new powerplant to the RXC lineup in the form of Ford's 3.5 L twin-turbocharged EcoBoost V6 engine, producing  @ 5,500 rpm and  @ 3,500 rpm. The RXC Turbo is also available with additional levels of sound deadening equipment in the interior to eliminate NVH at the cost of weight savings.

In 2017, the RXC Turbo was renamed the 'RXC GT'. It is now available with two optional tunes of the EcoBoost twin-turbo V6 engine, producing  in standard configuration, with the optional  tune shared by the contemporary RXC Spyder and RXC Turbo 600R.

RXC Spyder (2015–present) 
In January 2015's Autosport International show, Radical revealed its new track-only model, the RXC Spyder. Intended to replace the Radical SR8 RX as the company's flagship track car, the RXC Spyder features an open cockpit and significant aerodynamic additions over previous RXC models. The RXC Spyder was initially offered with only the 3.0 L RPE RPX-V8 engine from the RXC V8, producing  @ 9,100 rpm and  @ 7,500 rpm. In 2016 after the release of the RXC Turbo 500R, the RXC Spyder became available with the 500R's 3.5 L twin-turbo EcoBoost engine, producing  @ 6,700 rpm and  @ 4,200 rpm–6,200 rpm. Similarly, after the release of the RXC Turbo 600R in 2017, the RXC Spyder became available with the 600R's further upgraded 3.5 L twin-turbo EcoBoost engine, producing .

RXC Turbo 500 (2015–2016) 
At the 2015 Geneva Motor Show, Radical introduced a higher-performance version of the existing turbo road car, the RXC Turbo 500. All internals and externals of the car are carried over from the original Turbo, with the exception of the new uptuned 3.5 L EcoBoost engine. The RXC Turbo 500's EcoBoost V6 now produces  @ 6,100 rpm and  @ 5,000 rpm.

RXC Turbo 500R (2016–2017) 
A further development of the RXC Turbo 500 would come at the next year's 2016 Geneva Motor show in the form of the RXC Turbo 500R. The 500R features new weight-saving carbon fibre techniques that Radical claims cuts 50 kg from the original 500 model, as well as larger brakes paired to a new ABS system. The 3.5 L EcoBoost engine in 500R tune now produces  @ 6,700 rpm and  @ 4,200 rpm–6,200 rpm. The RXC 500R was produced on both track-only and road-legal Dunlop Tires.

RXC GT3 (2016–present) 

Also introduced in 2016 was the Radical RXC GT3, a modified version of the RXC Turbo homologated to FIA GT3 standards. Homologation was achieved with the RXC Turbo's 3.5 L EcoBoost engine, detuned to produce around  depending on individual championship rules, and a 6-speed semi-automatic transmission. Other differences from the RXC Turbo road car include a redesigned splitter, front canards, a modified rear wing and larger brake rotors and callipers.

RXC Turbo 600R (2017–present) 
At the 2017 Goodwood Festival of Speed, Radical made a surprise appearance with the new RXC Turbo 600R model. The 600R is designed and sold as a track-only racecar, although Radical produced a one-off road-legal car that they premiered at the Goodwood Festival of Speed. The RXC Turbo 600R features the same 3.5 L EcoBoost engine from prior Turbo models, now tuned to produce  paired to a 6-speed semi-automatic transmission.

Specifications

Powertrain 
The Radical RXC's powertrain has consisted of four different engines over its many models, although current RXCs now use Ford's EcoBoost turbocharged V6 exclusively in many different tunes. The engines are mid-rear mounted and drive the rear wheels.

Transmission 
The RXC began production with a 7-speed semi-automatic transmission manufactured by Quaife, but as of 2017 the 7-speed has been phased out in favor of a 6-speed semi-automatic also manufactured by Quaife specifically for the RXC.

Suspension 
The RXC uses double wishbone suspension on the front and rear axles, with interchangeable and adjustable anti-roll bars and Intrax dampers.

Chassis 
The RXC's chassis is a carbon tubular steel space frame with fibreglass body panels. Many RXC models are available with an optional upgrade that incorporates more carbon-fibre body panels in place of fibreglass for additional weight savings.

Wheels 
The RXC uses cast aluminum wheels of 17" diameter for the RXC GT and 18" for other current production models. Its disc brakes are sized at  front and  rear for the RXC GT,  front and  rear for the RXC Spyder and RXC Turbo 600R, and  front and  rear for the RXC GT3.

Performance
Below is a table of manufacturer-claimed performance values for the currently available models of the Radical RXC.

References

External links
Radical RXC GT official website

Rear mid-engine, rear-wheel-drive vehicles
Cars of England
Sports cars
2010s cars